Oualata or Walata (also Biru in 17th century chronicles) is a small oasis town in southeast Mauritania, located at the eastern end of the Aoukar basin. Oualata was important as a caravan city in the thirteenth and fourteenth centuries as the southern terminus of a trans-Saharan trade route and now it is a World Heritage Site.

History
Oualata is believed to have been first settled by an agro-pastoral people akin to the Mandé Soninke people who lived along the rocky promontories of the Tichitt-Oualata and Tagant cliffs of Mauritania facing the Aoukar basin. There, they built what are among the oldest stone settlements on the African continent.

The town formed part of the Ghana Empire and grew wealthy through trade. At the beginning of the thirteenth century Oualata replaced Aoudaghost as the principal southern terminus of the trans-Saharan trade and developed into an important commercial and religious centre. By the fourteenth century the city had become part of the Mali Empire.

An important trans-Saharan route began at Sijilmasa and passed through Taghaza with its salt mines and ended at Oualata.

Moroccan explorer Ibn Battuta found the inhabitants of Oualata were Muslim and mainly Massufa, a section of the Sanhaja. He was surprised by the great respect and independence that women enjoyed. He only gives a brief description of the town itself: "My stay at Iwalatan (Oualata) lasted about fifty days; and I was shown honour and entertained by its inhabitants. It is an excessively hot place, and boasts a few small date-palms, in the shade of which they sow watermelons. Its water comes from underground waterbeds at that point, and there is plenty of mutton to be had."  The town's original Mande name Biru had already shifted to the Berber Iwalatan, a reflection of the changing identity of the residents. This would change again with the town's Arabization, and the development of the current name, Walata.

From the second half of the fourteenth century Timbuktu gradually replaced Oualata as the southern terminus of the trans-Sahara route and Oualata declined in importance, becoming an increasingly poor backwater in comparison to the previous wealth of the town. The Berber diplomat, traveller and author, Leo Africanus, who visited the region in 1509-1510 gives a description in his book Descrittione dell’Africa: "Walata Kingdom: This is a small kingdom, and of mediocre condition compared to the other kingdoms of the blacks. In fact, the only inhabited places are three large villages and some huts spread about among the palm groves." By the time Leo Africanus visited the region, the composition of the kingdom also seems to have changed greatly to reflect a large Songhai speaking population residing within the town, stating in his book "The language of this region is called Songhai, and the inhabitants are black people, and the most friendly unto strangers." Furthermore, it was under this time that Oualata was a tribute-paying fiefdom under the status of the Songhai Empire; also reflected within Africanus' book Descrittione dell’Africa explaining "In my time this region was conquered by the king of Timbuktu and the prince of Oualata fled into the deserts, whereof the king granted him peace conditionally that he pay great yearly tribute and so the prince has remained tributary to the king of Timbuktu until this present."

The old town covers an area of about 600 m by 300 m, some of it now in ruins. The sandstone buildings are coated with banco and some are decorated with geometric designs. The mosque now lies on the eastern edge of the town but in earlier times may have been surrounded by other buildings. The French historian, Raymond Mauny, estimated that in the Middle Ages the town would have accommodated between 2000 and 3000 inhabitants. Today, Oualata is home to a manuscript museum, and is known for its highly decorative vernacular architecture. It was made a UNESCO World Heritage Site in 1996 together with Ouadane, Chinguetti and Tichitt.

Gallery

See also
En attendant les hommes,  2007 documentary film about women muralists in Oualata.

References

References

 Extracts are available here.

Further reading

External links

.

World Heritage Sites in Mauritania
Communes of Hodh Ech Chargui Region
Archaeological sites in Mauritania